Silverton is a city in Briscoe County, Texas, United States. The population was 731 at the 2010 census. It is the county seat of Briscoe County.

Geography

Silverton is located in west-central Briscoe County at  (34.471256, –101.304749). Texas State Highway 86 passes through the city, leading southeast  to Quitaque and west  to Tulia near Interstate 27. Texas State Highway 207 leads south from Silverton  to Floydada and north  to Claude.

Climate

According to the Köppen Climate Classification system, Silverton has a semi-arid climate, abbreviated "BSk" on climate maps.

Demographics

2020 census

As of the 2020 United States census, there were 629 people, 277 households, and 165 families residing in the city.

2000 census
As of the census of 2000, there were 771 people, 303 households, and 217 families living in the city. The population density was 766.4 people per square mile (294.7/km). There were 362 housing units at an average density of 359.8/sq mi (138.4/km). The racial makeup of the city was 79.51% White, 0.52% African American, 0.78% Native American, 15.69% from other races, and 3.50% from two or more races. Hispanic or Latino of any race were 28.15% of the population.

There were 303 households, out of which 31.7% had children under the age of 18 living with them, 60.7% were married couples living together, 7.6% had a female householder with no husband present, and 28.1% were non-families. 26.4% of all households were made up of individuals, and 16.5% had someone living alone who was 65 years of age or older. The average household size was 2.54 and the average family size was 3.09.

In the city, the population was spread out, with 28.7% under the age of 18, 7.3% from 18 to 24, 22.7% from 25 to 44, 21.1% from 45 to 64, and 20.2% who were 65 years of age or older. The median age was 38 years. For every 100 females, there were 86.7 males. For every 100 females age 18 and over, there were 88.4 males.

The median income for a household in the city was $27,014, and the median income for a family was $32,308. Males had a median income of $23,750 versus $16,750 for females. The per capita income for the city was $13,416. About 12.1% of families and 17.6% of the population were below the poverty line, including 29.4% of those under age 18 and 12.3% of those age 65 or over.

Education
The community of Silverton is served by the Silverton Independent School District and home to the Silverton High School Owls.

References

External links
Silverton school district

Cities in Briscoe County, Texas
Cities in Texas
County seats in Texas